Daniel Pinta Quigley is a four time world professional kickboxer from Derry, Northern Ireland. He was coached by the former three time world kickboxing champion Paddy Toland at PT's Kickboxing Gym in Carrigans, he now trains and coaches out of  out of his own gym called Strike Martial arts Academy in Derry City.

Quigley's titles include:
 ISKA European full contact cruiser weight title v Paul Hunt (England)
 ISKA World Full Contact cruiserweight title V Wayne Turner (England)
 ISKA World full contact Heavy weight title V Pacome Assi (France)
 ISKA World Full contact Super Heavy weight title V Jose Dela Lara (Spain)
 ISKA world k1 rules heavyweight title V Lucian Danilencu (Italy)

"Pinta", as he is widely known, has appeared on RTÉ local television, appearing on the RTÉ Nationwide programme in 2009, following his World Cruiser-weight title win over England's Wayne Turner. Pinta is a qualified personal trainer. He has won the Derry City Sports personality of the year award on two occasions.

Quigley won the ISKA Professional World Super Heavyweight Kickboxing title in Derry City, Northern Ireland in March 2013.

References

Year of birth missing (living people)
Living people
Male kickboxers from Northern Ireland
Sportspeople from Derry (city)